Valeri Klimov is the name of:
 Valeri Klimov (footballer) (born 1974), Russian footballer
 Valeri Klimov (ice hockey) (born 1986), product of the HC Spartak Moscow hockey system
 Valery Klimov (violinist) (born 1931), Russian violinist